Harold Morris (March 17, 1890 – May 6, 1964) was an American pianist, composer and educator.

Morris was born in San Antonio, Texas. He graduated from the University of Texas in 1910 and received his master's degree from the Cincinnati Conservatory of Music in 1922. He married Cosby Dansby, August 20, 1914; the couple had one daughter. Morris moved from his native San Antonio, Texas to New York in 1916.

Performances and compositions

Morris toured extensively as a recitalist and soloist and his compositions were performed frequently during his lifetime. He made his New York concert debut in recital in January 1921 at Aeolian Hall, with a program of Brahms, Busoni, Chopin, Godowsky, Cyril Scott and Charles T. Griffes. On November 21, 1931, Morris was the piano soloist for a performance of his Piano Concerto with the Boston Symphony Orchestra at Carnegie Hall. Morris' composition, Poem was performed by violinist and conductor Eugène Ysaÿe in Cincinnati, Ohio with the Cincinnati Orchestra on November 29, 1918. Violinist Josef Stransky performed the work at Carnegie Hall with the Philadelphia Orchestra three months later.

Teaching career

Morris taught at the Juilliard School of Music from 1922 to 1939, at Columbia University from 1939 to 1946, and at The Castle School in Tarrytown, New York. Morris also taught at his studio in Manhattan, at Rice Institute (1933), Duke University (1939–40), and the University of Texas. He died in New York City.

Leadership and Affiliations

Morris was one of the principal founders of the American Music Guild in New York in 1921. He served as United States director of the International Society for Contemporary Music from 1936 to 1940. From 1937 to 1963, Morris served variously as Vice President and Program Committee Chairman of the National Association of American Composers and Conductors.

Selected Compositions
<ref>The New Grove Dictionary of Music and Musicians, Vol. 12, Edited by Stanley Sadie, Macmillan Publishers, London, 1980</ref>

For Orchestra

 Poem, after Tagore's Gitanjali (1918)
 Dum-a-Lum, variations on a Negro spiritual (1925)
 Piano Concerto on Two Negro Themes (1931)
 Symphony No. 1, after Browning's Prospice (1934)
 Violin Concerto (1939)
 Passacaglia and Fugue (1939)
 Suite (1941)
 American Epic (1942)
 Heroic Overture (1943)
 Symphony No. 2, "Victory" (1943)
 Symphony No. 3, "Amaranth" (1948)

Chamber music

 Piano Sonata in B-flat minor, Op. 2 
 Opus No. 3 (1915) (solo piano)
 Violin Sonata
 Prologue and Scherzo (flute, violin, cello and piano)
 Rhapsody'' (flute, cello, and piano)

Footnotes

External links
  (John Ranck, pianist)

American male composers
University of Cincinnati – College-Conservatory of Music alumni
University of Texas at Austin alumni
University of Texas at Austin faculty
Columbia University faculty
Juilliard School faculty
Rice University faculty
Duke University faculty
Texas classical music
American music educators
1890 births
1964 deaths
20th-century American composers
20th-century American pianists
American male pianists
20th-century American male musicians